"Believe for It" is a song by American gospel singer CeCe Winans, which was released on March 26, 2021, as the second single from her first live album, also titled Believe for It (2021). Winans co-wrote the song with Dwan Hill, Kyle Lee, and Mitch Wong. Kyle Lee produced the single.

"Believe for It" peaked at number nine on the US Hot Christian Songs chart, and number one on the Hot Gospel Songs chart. The song was ranked by Billboard as the fourth biggest gospel song in 2021, and the eighth biggest gospel song in 2022. "Believe for It" won the GMA Dove Award Gospel Worship Recorded Song of the Year at the 2021 GMA Dove Awards. The song also won the Grammy Award for Best Contemporary Christian Music Performance/Song at the 2022 Grammy Awards. At the 2022 GMA Dove Awards, "Believe for It" won the GMA Dove Award for Song of the Year, while the duet version featuring Lauren Daigle was nominated for Contemporary Gospel Recorded Song of the Year.

Background
"Believe for It" was initially released as the first and only promotional single from CeCe Winans' live album of the same name on February 5, 2021. On February 12, 2021, the radio team of Fair Trade Services announced that the song would be serviced to Christian radio in the United States, the official add date for the single slated on March 26, 2021. Winans shared the story behind the song, saying:

Composition

Reception

Critical response 
JubileeCast's Timothy Yap called the song "a dramatic and crescendo-building anthem about how God can do the impossible" in his review. Kevin Davis of NewReleaseToday said the song was an album standout, saying "It's a song that is filled with so much power and worship, and I love that." The Washington Informer also said the track was an album favourite, saying that "her [Winans'] vocals, with the message, are magnified into a very powerful instrument that put tears in my eyes every time I hear it." Howard Dukes of SoulTracks gave a positive review of the song, saying "'Believe for It' is a song with a message that is meant for the time in which we live."

Accolades

Commercial performance
Following the release of "Believe for It" as a promotional single, the song debuted at number nine on the US Hot Gospel Songs chart dated February 20, 2021. "Believe for It" ascended to number one on the Hot Gospel Songs chart dated June 12, 2021, becoming her second Hot Gospel Songs chart-topping hit after her song "Pray" topped the chart for two weeks in January 2006. "Believe for It" spent twelve weeks at number one, and a total of forty-six weeks overall on the Hot Gospel Songs chart.

"Believe for It" debuted at number 22 on the US Hot Christian Songs dated April 3, 2021. The song peaked at number nine on the Hot Christian Songs chart dated August 21, 2021, and spent twenty-eight weeks overall on the chart.

Music videos
The lyric video of the song was published on CeCe Winans' YouTube channel on February 12, 2021. On February 25, 2021, Winans released the acoustic one take session video of the song via YouTube. The official audio video for the live version of "Believe for It" showcasing the album's cover art was uploaded on YouTube on March 12, 2021. On June 15, 2021, Winans released the official live music video of "Believe for It" filmed at Trinity Broadcasting Network through YouTube. The official audio video for the duet version of "Believe For It" featuring Lauren Daigle showcasing the single's cover art was uploaded on YouTube on March 12, 2021.

Track listing

Charts

Weekly charts

Year-end charts

Believe for It (Eu Creio) version

CeCe Winans and Gabriela Rocha released "Believe for It (Eu Creio)" on August 26, 2022, as a standalone single. "Believe for It (Eu Creio)" features Winans singing part of the track in English and Rocha singing in Portuguese.

Commercial performance
"Believe for It (Eu Creio)" debuted at No. 22 on the Hot Gospel Songs chart dated September 10, 2022.

Track listing

Charts

Release history

References

External links
  on PraiseCharts

2021 singles
2021 songs
CeCe Winans songs